NA-254 Nasirabad-cum-Kachhi-cum-Jhal Magsi  is a newly-created constituency for the National Assembly of Pakistan. It comprises the districts of Nasirabad, Kachhi and Jhal Magsi from the province of Balochistan.

Assembly Segments

Members of Parliament

Since 2018: NA-260 Nasirabad-cum-Kachhi-cum-Jhal Magsi

Election 2018 

General elections were held on 25 July 2018.

See also
NA-253 Harnai-cum-Sibbi-cum-Kohlu-cum-Dera Bugti
NA-261 Sohbat Pur-cum-Jaffarabad-cum-Usta Muhammad

References 

National Assembly Constituencies of Pakistan